Chorakhe Bua is a neighbourhood in east Bangkok. It roughly occupies the area of the khwaeng (subdistrict) of the same name in Lat Phrao district.

History
Originally, the area of Chorakhe Bua was very spacious. It covers parts of Bang Kapi, Bang Khen and Khan Na Yao Districts today. In 1997, two parts of Chorakhe Bua switched to Bang Khen District.

Geography
Chorakhe Bua is the northern part of the district. Its adjoining subdistricts, clockwise from the north, are Anusawari and Tha Raeng in Bang Khen District, Lat Phrao in its district, and Sena Nikhom in Chatuchak District.

Transportation
Lat Pla Khao Road
Prasoet Manukit Road (Highway 351)

References

Subdistricts of Bangkok
Lat Phrao district
Neighbourhoods of Bangkok